Rauhalahti power station is a combined heat and power station built in 1986 in Jyväskylä, Finland. It is the main provider of district heat in Jyväskylä and it produced the steam used by Kangas Paper Mill until the mill was shut down in 2009. The construction cost of the plant was 84 million euros.

The plant is operated by Jyväskylän Energiantuotanto, which is owned by Jyväskylän Energia. Fortum owned 60 per cent of the company but Jyväskylän Energia bought the share for 40 million euros.

Power station's main sources of energy are firewood and peat; use of coal is rare. The peat is mainly provided by Neova, while the firewood is provided by sawmills in Central Finland and nearby wood processing industry.

See also 

 Energy in Finland
 List of power stations in Finland

References

External links

Jyväskylä
Biofuel power stations in Finland
Peat-fired power stations in Finland
Coal-fired power stations in Finland
Buildings and structures in Central Finland